Antonio Ruíz (born 7 August 1961) is a Mexican sprinter. He competed in the men's 4 × 100 metres relay at the 1988 Summer Olympics.

References

External links
 

1961 births
Living people
Athletes (track and field) at the 1988 Summer Olympics
Mexican male sprinters
Olympic athletes of Mexico
Place of birth missing (living people)
20th-century Mexican people